Dirk Rossmann GmbH, commonly referred to as Rossmann, is one of the largest drug store chains in Europe with around 56,200 employees and more than 4000 stores. In 2019  Rossmann had more than €10 billion turnover in Germany, Poland, Hungary, the Czech Republic, Turkey, Albania, Kosovo and Spain.

The company was founded in 1972 by Dirk Rossmann with its headquarters in Burgwedel near Hanover in Germany. The Rossmann family owns 60% of the company. The Hong Kong-based A.S. Watson Group owns 40%, which was taken over from the Dutch Kruidvat in 2004.

The product range includes up to 21,700 items and can vary depending on the size of the shop and the location. In addition to drugstore goods with a focus on skin, hair, body, baby and health, Rossmann also offers promotional items ("World of Ideas"), pet food, a photo service and a wide range of natural foods and wines. There is also a perfume range with around 200 commercial brands. Rossmann has 29 private brands with 4600 products (as of 2019). In 1997, the first own brands Babydream, Facelle, Sunozon and Winston were introduced. The best-known Rossmann brands are Isana (skin, hair and body care), Alterra (natural cosmetics), domol (cleaning and laundry detergents) alouette (paper tissues etc). The company logo consists of a red name and the symbol of a centaur integrated in the letter O: a mythical creature made of horse and man from Greek mythology, which symbolically stands for "Rossmann" (English: "Horse man"). The company's own brands have a small centaur symbol above the name.
Since 2018, Rossmann has been publishing a sustainability report for the development of corporate climate protection activities.

In 2021, sales increased by 8.1 percent to 11.1 billion euros. There are a total of 4,361 Rossmann branches, 2,231 of which are in Germany. The current number of foreign branches is: Poland (1580), Hungary (more than 230), Czech Republic (more than 150), Turkey (more than 120), Albania (15), Kosovo (6) and Spain (5).

Gallery

See also
dm-drogerie markt
Müller
Douglas

References

External links 

 

Retail companies established in 1972
German brands
Pharmacies of Germany
Companies based in Lower Saxony

AS Watson